Geçitli is a municipality (belde) in the central district of Hakkâri Province in Turkey. The settlement is populated by Kurds of the Silehî tribe and had a population of 2,715 in 2022.

Population 
Population history from 2000 to 2022:

References 

Kurdish settlements in Hakkâri Province
Populated places in Hakkâri Province